Helen Scott-Orr  is an Australian veterinarian and epidemiologist. Scott-Orr served, from 25 July 2016 until 24 July 2019, as the Inspector-General of Biosecurity, a statutory body under the federal agriculture portfolio. She is a former Chief Veterinary Officer of New South Wales and Executive Director within the NSW Department of Primary Industries.

Education

Scott-Orr completed a Bachelor of Veterinary Science (with honours) at the University of Sydney. She then completed a Diploma in Bacteriology, Microbiology and Immunology through the London School of Hygiene and Tropical Medicine. She was admitted as a member of the Australian College of Veterinary Scientists in Epidemiology in 1988. She became a fellow of the Australian Institute of Company Directors in 2005.

Career
Scott-Orr has had a Government career spanning 40 years.

She is well known for her contribution to rabies control in Indonesia, and her efforts to increase preparedness in case of a rabies incursion into Northern Australia. She is the recipient of an Australian Government Public Service Medal (PSM).

Scott-Orr had a major role in the control and management of bovine brucellosis and tuberculosis.

She has undertaken a strategic investigation into White spot syndrome incursion into Australia.

Scott-Orr was appointed on 25 July 2016 as the first Inspector-General of Biosecurity. She was succeeded by Rob Delane on 25 July 2019.

Affiliations
 Coordinator, Crawford Fund NSW Committee
 Board Director, Animal Health Australia
 Honorary Association Professor, Faculty of Veterinary Science, University of Sydney
 Board Director, Invasive Animals Cooperative Research Centre

Former associations
 Project leader, Australian Centre for International Agricultural Research, NSW Department of Primary Industries http://aciar.gov.au/project/ah/2006/166
 Trustee, Organic Research and Education Trust
 NSW Agriculture, Department of Primary Industries
 Board member, Cotton Catchment Communities CRC board
 Board Director, Cattle and Beef Quality Cooperative Research Centre
 Board Director, Australian Sheep Industry Cooperative Research Centre
 Former board member, Sustainable Rice Production Cooperative Research Centre

Awards
Scott-Orr received the Seddon Memorial Prize in 1991.

She received a Public Service Medal at the 2010 Australia Day Awards for Outstanding Public Service to Agricultural and Veterinary Science.

In the 2021 Queen's Birthday Honours she was appointed a Member of the Order of Australia for "significant service to public administration, to biosecurity, and to veterinary science".

Personal life
Helen Scott-Orr lives in Millthorpe, New South Wales.

References

Living people
Australian women scientists
Australian veterinarians
Australian epidemiologists
University of Sydney alumni
Recipients of the Public Service Medal (Australia)
Alumni of the London School of Hygiene & Tropical Medicine
Year of birth missing (living people)
Women veterinarians
Fellows of the Australian Institute of Company Directors
Members of the Order of Australia